Henriette Manigk (also called Jette) (born 30 April 1968 at Usedom) is a German painter.

life 
Manigk is the daughter of the painter Oskar Manigk and granddaughter of the painter Otto Manigk. She completed her graduation in 1986 in Wolgast. From 1986 to 1987, she worked in the painting studio of the theater of Greifswald. In 1990, she made a study trip to Kenya with a stop at Nani Groze-Grieshaber. From 1996 to 1997, she worked in blue Meier's studio in Bremen.

From 1994 to 1998, she studied art, art therapy and art education at the State University Ottersberg, she received her diploma in 1998.

She lives and works in Bremen since 1998. Manigk has a son.

Solo exhibitions / awards (selection) 
 2001: gallery Paula Panke, Berlin
 2002: gallery Schwartzsche Villa, Berlin
 2003: gallery in Kulturhaus Spandau / gallery Arcus, Berlin
 2004: gallery W, Bremen
 2005: gallery Veritti Art, Berlin
 2006: zapp-live-gallery, Berlin
 2009: Art Award Elbfeuer, Hamburg

Group exhibitions (selection) 
 1998: gallery Kubo, Bremen
 2000: museum in Syke
 2003: gallery Kunstpavillon, Usedom
 2004: gallery Wollhalle, with Oskar Manigk, Güstrow
 2004: gallery am Wasserturm, Berlin
 2005: gallery Kunstpavillon, Usedom
 2006: gallery Kunstpavillon, Usedom
 2007: gallery East End, Delmenhorst

References

External links 
 paintings in Künstlerportal (in German language)
 paintings in homepage Henriette Manigk (in German language)

1968 births
Living people
20th-century German painters
21st-century German painters
German women painters
20th-century German women
21st-century German women